Larry Kessler is the Founding Director of the AIDS Action Committee of Massachusetts, an agency that has served over half of all people diagnosed with AIDS in Massachusetts, educated generations about the disease, and secured progressive city, state, and federal AIDS policy.

About

Social Activism
Kessler was born in 1942 in Pittsburgh, Pennsylvania.  In his time, he has been an ironworker, a small businessman, a seminarian, and a community organizer.  In 1960, after high school, he briefly studied for the priesthood before getting involved full-time in social activism through a wide variety of different causes.

Kessler founded and directed Project Appalachia, an anti-poverty program, from 1966-1968.  The Meals on Wheels program he started in McKees Rock, Pennsylvania, still operates today.  As co-founder and director of Pittsburgh's Thomas Merton Center from 1970-1973, he took an active role in the civil rights, anti-poverty, and anti-war movements.

Kessler continued his activism at Boston's Paulist Center from 1973-1979, where he expanded the Walk for Hunger into the year-round anti-hunger program, Project Bread.  During Boston's desegregation crisis in 1974, Kessler served as a bus monitor to help Boston kids get to school safely.

AIDS Action Committee
While running a successful business in 1982, Kessler first heard about the onset of the HIV/AIDS epidemic.  He and others met at Fenway Community Health Clinic to discuss the crisis, and AAC was created.  Kessler became its first employee in 1983, and is now the longest-serving director of any AIDS group in the country.

Kessler served as AAC's Executive Director from 1983 until early 2002, when he moved into the Founding Director's role at the agency.

AAC now employs nearly 100 people, serves over 2,400 men, women, and children living with HIV, and educates thousands around the state of Massachusetts.

The Larry Kessler 5K Run
AAC relies on funding each year from its annual AIDS Walk Boston and Larry Kessler 5K Run where participants engage in peer-to-peer fundraising in support of the agency.  The Larry Kessler 5K Run was created as a 5K race held concurrently with AIDS Walk Boston in 2001. It was renamed in honor of AAC's founding director in 2006, and has since been referred to as the Larry Kessler 5K Run.

References

External links
 AIDS Action Committee of Massachusetts
 AIDS Walk Boston and the Larry Kessler 5K Run

HIV/AIDS activists
HIV/AIDS in the United States
Living people
Year of birth missing (living people)